Petersfield Rugby Football Club is a rugby union club based in the town of Petersfield, Hampshire, England.  The men's first XV currently compete in London 3 South West - a league at the eighth tier of the English rugby union system - following the club's promotion from Hampshire Premier at the end of the 2019–20 season. There are also men's 2nd XV and 3rd XV, both of whom play in the Hampshire regional leagues.

History

The club was formed in 1927, at the instigation of Frank Guy, a former pupil of Churcher's College, with which the club still enjoys an excellent relationship. Affiliated to the Hampshire Union in the same year, the club quickly became a focus for both sporting and social activity. In that first year, its vice-presidents included five doctors, two clergymen and two ladies!  Petersfield’s long reputation as a highly hospitable venue for sport was rapidly established. By 1934 the club was running two teams and gained its first county honour when G.E.Twine was capped to play against Kent (Hampshire won 6-3). In those days players were “carded” the post being sufficiently rapid and reliable to ensure that players were aware that they had been selected for the next match.  In 1938 the club changed its colours to its well-known scarlet and white hoop.

The club affiliated itself to the Rugby Football Union in 1948 and in that year moved to Love Lane Stadium. However, as the club grew, the need was soon recognised to provide a more permanent home in the town. Plans were well advanced to build a separate clubhouse at Love Lane, when the Town Council decided to develop the Penns Place site at the edge of the town. The club moved to Penns Place in 1979;  the first clubhouse was a wooden structure which was irreparably damaged in the Great Storm of 1987.  In 1989 Frank Guy, the founder member, officially opened the current clubhouse with a celebratory match between a Petersfield XV and Derek White’s Invitation XV being played.  At the beginning of the 2006-07 season, a new changing room block was opened.  This development was made necessary by the loss of the changing facility in the Taro Centre, which had been a key assumption in the design of the 1979 and 1989 clubhouses.  After several years where portable cabins were used for changing, the new development was achieved through the significant support of the Rugby Football Foundation, grants and fundraising by Club members.

Ex-Petersfield player Tim Rodber is one of the club's best known old boys, having gone on to be capped for England, and the British and Irish Lions. Ex-Scotland and British and Irish Lions player Derek White is another high profile international with strong links to PRFC having been involved in coaching the senior players and occasionally running out for the 1st XV.

The club has reputation for an outstanding youth setup and want to create a centre of excellence to push players through the ranks.  Recent success stories include the ex Harlequin F.C., Newcastle Falcons, Sale Sharks and Bristol Rugby winger Charlie Amesbury, England Women Red Rose and Harlequins fullback, Fiona Pocock, Joe Atkinson, capped by England U18s and England Students, who joined Wasps RFC for the 2018-19 season before moving to Bedford Blues  and Will Spencer (rugby union), current Leicester Tigers player.  Dr James Alder became Director of Rugby at the beginning of the 2016-17 season, leading the 1st XV to a League and Cup double.

The Club was joined following the 2017-18 season by Bernard James Rhodes as Director of Rugby, despite his limited experience in the Hampshire leagues. Unfortunately the club struggled under the new guidance and were relegated the following year. Club favourite Pam Cheeseman returned at the same time as Director of Women's Rugby, as well as club legend Andy Barnes (1256 1st XV Points) after a few years developing himself in the higher leagues.

The 2019/20 season saw further changes with a new head coach in Jason Ford and a new forwards coach in ex Portsmouth RFC Head Coach Jim Pearce. Petersfield were also fortunate enough to be joined by ex Bath and Wales Exiles centre Tom Cheeseman on a £1 per week deal for the 2019/20 season.

Recent Performances

In the RFU English Clubs Championship, Petersfield has achieved the following outcomes in recent seasons:

(Competition results from England Rugby )

Club Honours
Hampshire 2 champions (2): 1988–89, 2013–14
Hampshire Premier champions (3): 2001–02, 2016–17, 2019–20
Hampshire Bowl winners (2): 2006, 2007 
Hampshire 1 v Surrey 1 promotion playoff winners: 2009–10
Hampshire Plate winners: 2017

See also
List of English rugby union teams

References

External links
Official Website
Clubhouse Website

English rugby union teams
Petersfield
Rugby union clubs in Hampshire